(The Captive Queen or The Liberated Queen), Op. 48, is a composition for mixed chorus and orchestra by Jean Sibelius. He completed the work, which is a setting of a text by Paavo Cajander, in 1906.

 was first performed in Helsinki on 8 February 1906 by the Orchestra of Helsinki Philharmonic Society, conducted by the composer. Sibelius arranged it for men's chorus in 1910. This version was first performed on 28 November 1913 by the Choir of the Students’ Union, conducted by Heikki Klemetti. The work has been described as "strong and powerful, showing Sibelius’s dramatic vein".

Literature 
 Tomi Mäkelä: "Jean Sibelius und seine Zeit" (German), Laaber-Verlag, Regensburg 2013

References

External links 
 
 ean Sibelius (1865-1957): Vapautettu kuningatar op. 48 text from Naxos

Choral compositions
Compositions by Jean Sibelius
1906 compositions